The Fundació Ramon Llull (English: "Ramon Llull Foundation"), also known by the acronym FRL, is an international organization constituted in 2008 in order to promote Catalan language and culture internationally. Its members are the following institutions from countries and regions where Catalan language is spoken: the Government of Andorra, the Ramon Llull Institute (through which the governments of Catalonia and the Balearic Islands participate), the General Council of the Pyrénées-Orientales, the city council of Alghero and the Network of Valencian Cities.

The foundation is named after Ramon Llull, a medieval writer and philosopher from the Balearic Islands, who is considered the first notable writer in the Catalan language and contributed substantially to its development.

Location and structure
FRL headquarters are in Andorra la Vella, the capital of Andorra. Its president is the head of government of Andorra. Since 2022, its manager is Andorran Author Teresa Colom.

References

External links
 Ramon Llull Institute Official Web Page

Andorran culture
Balearic culture
Catalan culture
Valencian culture
Foundations based in Andorra
Catalan advocacy organizations
Organizations established in 2008
2008 establishments in Andorra